The Democratic Confederation of Labour (CDT) is the third largest national trade union centre in the Democratic Republic of the Congo. It is affiliated with the International Trade Union Confederation.

References

Trade unions in the Democratic Republic of the Congo
International Trade Union Confederation
Kinshasa